Ubiquinol-cytochrome c reductase complex assembly factor 2 is a protein that in humans is encoded by the UQCC2 gene. Located in the mitochondrial nucleoid, this protein is a complex III assembly factor, playing a role in cytochrome b biogenesis along with the UQCC1 protein. It regulates insulin secretion and mitochondrial ATP production and oxygen consumption. In the sole recorded case, a mutation in the UQCC2 gene caused Complex III deficiency, characterized by intrauterine growth retardation, neonatal lactic acidosis, and renal tubular dysfunction.

Structure 
The UQCC2 gene is located on the p arm of chromosome 6 in position 21.31 and spans 14,990 base pairs. The gene produces a  14.9 kDa protein composed of 126 amino acids. This protein has no homologous domains with other known proteins. It is associated with the mitochondrial nucleoid, likely located in the peripheral region. This protein's distribution pattern is similar to other components of the mitochondrial nucleoid, like mtSSB and PHB1/PHB2.

Function 
This gene encodes a nucleoid protein localized to the mitochondrial inner membrane and sublocalized to the mitochondrial matrix. The encoded protein permissively regulates insulin secretion in pancreatic beta cells, positively regulates mitochondrial ATP production and oxygen consumption, and is involved in late skeletal muscle differentiation through modulation of mitochondrial respiratory chain activity. This protein is required for the assembly of the Complex III. Expression of this protein is decreased in cells with low mtDNA.

Clinical Significance 
In the sole recorded case, a homozygous mutation in intron 2 of the UQCC2 gene caused a splicing disruption; the patient presented with symptoms of nuclear type 7 Complex III deficiency, including neonatal lactic acidosis, renal tubulopathy, and severe intrauterine growth retardation. Additional clinical features included a dysmorphic facial appearance, delayed psychomotor development, autistic features, aggressive behavior, and mild sensorineural hearing loss. Additionally, the patient had decreased levels of UQCC1.

Interactions 
This protein interacts with UQCC1.

References

Further reading 

 
 
 
 
 
 

Human proteins
Mitochondrial proteins